Mediator of RNA polymerase II transcription subunit 27 is an enzyme that in humans is encoded by the MED27 gene. It forms part of the Mediator complex.

The ubiquitous expression of Med27 mRNA suggests a universal requirement for Med27 in transcriptional initiation. Loss of Crsp34/Med27 decreases amacrine cell number, but increases the number of rod photoreceptor cells.

The activation of gene transcription is a multistep process that is triggered by factors that recognize transcriptional enhancer sites in DNA. These factors work with co-activators to direct transcriptional initiation by the RNA polymerase II apparatus. The protein encoded by this gene is a subunit of the CRSP (cofactor required for SP1 activation) complex, which, along with TFIID, is required for efficient activation by SP1. This protein is also a component of other multisubunit complexes e.g. thyroid hormone receptor-(TR-) associated proteins which interact with TR and facilitate TR function on DNA templates in conjunction with initiation factors and cofactors.

See also
 Mediator complex

References

Further reading

Protein families